The 1956 European Rowing Championships were rowing championships held on Lake Bled in the city of Bled which, at the time, was located in Yugoslavia. Men competed in all seven Olympic boat classes (M1x, M2x, M2-, M2+, M4-, M4+, M8+), and women entered in five boat classes (W1x, W2x, W4x+, W4+, W8+). Many of the men competed two months later at the Olympic Games in Melbourne; women would first be allowed to compete at Olympic level in 1976.

Background
FISA, the International Rowing Federation, decided at its congress held just prior to the 1955 Championships in Ghent to award the 1956 Championships to Bled, and that the 1957 Championships were to be hosted by Duisburg.

Medal summary – women's events

Medal summary – men's events

References

European Rowing Championships
European Rowing Championships
Rowing
Rowing